The Church of St. Anne in the vicinity of Allen, Louisiana is a historic church built in 1916.  It is located at the southwest corner of the intersection of LA 485 and Blosmoore Road. It was added to the National Register in 1994.

It was deemed notable "because it is a rare example of the Gothic Revival style within Natchitoches Parish."

References

Churches on the National Register of Historic Places in Louisiana
Gothic Revival church buildings in Louisiana
Churches completed in 1916
Churches in Natchitoches Parish, Louisiana
National Register of Historic Places in Natchitoches Parish, Louisiana